An annular solar eclipse occurred at the Moon's ascending node of the orbit on May 31, 2003. A solar eclipse occurs when the Moon passes between Earth and the Sun, thereby totally or partly obscuring the image of the Sun for a viewer on Earth. An annular solar eclipse occurs when the Moon's apparent diameter is smaller than the Sun's, blocking most of the Sun's light and causing the Sun to look like an annulus (ring). An annular eclipse appears as a partial eclipse over a region of the Earth thousands of kilometres wide.
Annularity was visible across central Greenland, the Faroe Islands, Iceland, Jan Mayen and northern Scotland. Partiality was visible throughout Europe, Asia, and far northwestern Canada.

Images

Related eclipses

Eclipse season 

This is the second eclipse this season.

First eclipse this season: 16 May 2003 Total Lunar Eclipse

Eclipses of 2003 

 A total lunar eclipse on May 16.
 An annular solar eclipse (one limit) on May 31.
 A total lunar eclipse on November 9.
 A total solar eclipse on November 23.

Tzolkinex 
 Preceded: Solar eclipse of April 17, 1996

 Followed: Solar eclipse of July 11, 2010

Half-Saros 
 Preceded: Lunar eclipse of May 25, 1994

 Followed: Lunar eclipse of June 4, 2012

Tritos 
 Preceded: Solar eclipse of June 30, 1992

 Followed: Solar eclipse of April 29, 2014

Solar Saros 147 
 Preceded: Solar eclipse of May 19, 1985

 Followed: Solar eclipse of June 10, 2021

Inex 
 Preceded: Solar eclipse of June 20, 1974

 Followed: Solar eclipse of May 9, 2032

Solar eclipses 2000–2003

Saros 147

Tritos series

Metonic series

See also 
 List of solar eclipses visible from the United Kingdom 1000–2090 AD

Notes

References

Photos:
 Spaceweather.com solar eclipse gallery
 Czech Republic. Prof. Druckmüller's eclipse photography site
 Eclipse in the Mist, APOD 6/4/2003, Dawn partial from Charneux, Belgium
 Ring of Fire from Cape Wrath, APOD 6/5/2003, Annular eclipse from Cape Wrath, northwestern coast of Scotland
 Sun, Moon, Hot Air Balloon, APOD 6/6/2003, partial eclipse from Bonn, Germany
 Clouds and the Moon Move to Block the Sun, APOD 6/18/2003, partial eclipse from Vienna, Austria
 Photos of solar eclipse around the world

2003 5 31
2003 in science
2003 5 31
May 2003 events